The Lagos State Ministry of Economic Planning and Budget is a government ministry of Lagos State, Nigeria. It is tasked with the responsibility to plan, draft and implement policies on the state's economic planning and budget.
The ministry was formed in June 2009.

Responsibilities
Preparation of Annual Budget of the State Government and processing of Annual Budget of Parastatals.
Advisory services on Local Government Budget.
Production of statistical data on the activities of the State Government.
Offering advice to Government on implementation of project and programmes.
Commissioning and commenting on feasibility studies, plans and programmes of Ministries, Offices and Bureau.

See also
Lagos State Ministry of Finance
Lagos State Executive Council

References

Government ministries of Lagos State